Zoran Slavica (born 28 March 1967) is a Croatian professional football manager and former player, who was most recently the manager of Treća HNL club NK Vodice.

Club career
During his professional career he played for Šibenik in his hometown and for Hajduk Split.

International career
Slavica also earned one cap for the Croatia national team in October 1992, against the Mexico national team.

References

External links
 

1967 births
Living people
Sportspeople from Šibenik
Association football goalkeepers
Yugoslav footballers
Croatian footballers
Croatia international footballers
HNK Šibenik players
HNK Hajduk Split players
HNK Rijeka players
HNK Suhopolje players
Yugoslav Second League players
Yugoslav First League players
Croatian Football League players
First Football League (Croatia) players
Croatian football managers
HNK Šibenik managers